John Walton Smith (born August 5, 1950) is a former American athlete, who competed in the sprints events during his career. He is best known for winning the 400 m event at the 1971 Pan American Games.  He remains the world record holder for the 440 yard dash at 44.5 seconds.  He set the record while winning the USA Outdoor Track and Field Championships on June 26, 1971 while running for the Southern California Striders.  The record has stood since then due to metrification in the sport.  Contemporary athletes rarely run or are timed officially for the extra 2.34 meters to equal 440 yards.

Smith came as a favorite to the 1972 Summer Olympics, but injured a hamstring in the 400 m final and failed to finish the race.

After retiring from competition, he became a sprint coach, training Maurice Greene and Ato Boldon amongst others. At the time, his team called HSI (standing for Hudson Smith International) was the top sprint team in the world.  He coached Carmelita Jeter, who held the second fastest 100 m time after Florence Griffith-Joyner. He also coaches/coached Norwegian sprinter Jaysuma Saidy Ndure, Nigerian sprinter Blessing Okagbare, Commonwealth Games Champion, and English Gardner, NCAA Champion at Oregon and US Outdoor Champion.

Smith ran for Fremont High School in Los Angeles, finishing fifth in the 440 at the CIF California State Meet two years in a row, 1967-8.  He also won the City Championships in the long jump.  In 1967, he finished one place behind Wayne Collett from Gardena High School, one year his senior.  He would next join Collett at UCLA, forming a powerhouse team.  They won the NCAA 4x440/400 relay championships four years in a row, 1969-72.  Smith won the individual 440 in 1971 and 400 in 1972 and both years UCLA won the overall team championship.  Both Collett and Smith qualified for the 1972 Olympic team in the 400.  Following his athletic career, he coached UCLA for 17 years before branching off to the HSI team.

Athletes coached by John Smith
 Steve Lewis 3 Olympic gold medals, 1 silver, World Junior Record 400 meters since 1988
Marie-José Pérec  3 Olympic gold medals, 2 World Championship gold medals
 Kevin Young Olympic gold medal, 1 World Championship gold medal, world record 400 meters hurdles since 1992
 Danny Everett Olympic gold and bronze medals
 Michael Marsh 2 Olympic gold medals, 1 silver, 1 World Championship gold medal
Quincy Watts  2 Olympic gold medals, 2 World Championship medals, 1 gold
 Mike Powell 2 Olympic silver medals, 2 World Championship gold medals, world record in the long jump since 1991
Maurice Greene  4 Olympic medals, 2 gold, 5 World Championship gold medals, World record 100 metres
Inger Miller 1 Olympic gold medal, 5 World Championship medals, 3 gold but 1 disqualified due to Marion Jones
David Neville 2 Olympic medals, 1 gold
Lawrence Johnson  Olympic silver medal
Hadi Soua'an Al-Somaily  Olympic silver medal
Ato Boldon  4 Olympic medals, 4 World Championship medals, 1 gold
Dalilah Muhammad Olympic Gold Medal, 2 World Championship Silver Medals
Jon Drummond  2 Olympic medals, 1 gold, 2 World Championship gold medals
Allen Johnson  Olympic gold medal, 5 World Championship medals, 4 gold
English Gardner 1 Olympic Gold Medal, 2 World Championship Silver Medals
Dawn Harper 2 Olympic medals, 1 gold, 2 World Championship Medals
Richard Thompson  3 Olympic medals, 1 World Championship medal
Emmanuel Callender  2 Olympic medals, 1 World Championship medal
Tasha Danvers  1 Olympic medal
Kristi Castlin 1 Olympic Bronze Medal
Cathy Freeman  trained with HSI for a short period of time.  2 Olympic medals, 1 gold,  2 World Championship gold medals
Torri Edwards 1 Olympic medal disqualified due to Marion Jones, 4 World Championship medals, 2 gold
Jason Richardson  Olympic silver medal, World Championship gold medal
Christian Coleman 2 World Championship Silver Medals, World Indoor Championship Gold Medal, World Indoor Record Holder for the 60 meter dash
Regina Jacobs 2 World Championship silver medals
Anju Bobby George  first World Championship medal for India
Jehue Gordon  1 World Championship Gold Medal
Khalifa St. Fort   1 World Championship Bronze Medal
Dezerea Bryant 1 World Championship Silver Medal
Michael Norman 2 World Junior Championship Gold Medals, World Indoor 400m Record Holder 
Leonard Scott World Indoor Championship Gold Medal
Martial Mbandjock 
Pilar McShine 
Jaysuma Saidy Ndure 
Mohammed Shaween 
Kenneth Ferguson
Jason Pyrah

References

1950 births
Living people
American male sprinters
Olympic track and field athletes of the United States
Athletes (track and field) at the 1971 Pan American Games
Athletes (track and field) at the 1972 Summer Olympics
University of California, Los Angeles alumni
American track and field coaches
Track and field athletes from Los Angeles
Pan American Games gold medalists for the United States
Pan American Games medalists in athletics (track and field)
Track and field people from California
Medalists at the 1971 Pan American Games